Paraletes is a genus of South American dwarf spiders that was first described by Alfred Frank Millidge in 1991.

Species
 it contains only two species:
Paraletes pogo Miller, 2007 – Peru
Paraletes timidus Millidge, 1991 (type) – Brazil

See also
 List of Linyphiidae species (I–P)

References

Araneomorphae genera
Linyphiidae
Spiders of South America